Starboard Value is an American hedge fund that was founded in 2002 by Jeffrey Smith and Mark Mitchell with Smith serving as CEO.

History 
Starboard Value began as part of Ramius Capital in 2002. Peter Feld joined Smith and Mitchell in 2005.

Starboard Value merged with the Cowen Group in 2008, and was Cowen's hedge-fund until 2011, when it went independent. Smith, Mitchell, and Feld all stayed with Starboard.

Structure 
Starboard has a five-member board of directors.  As of February 2019, the five directors were John Leonard, chief executive officer of Intellia Therapeutics; Jeffrey Smith, Starboard's own chief executive officer; Janet Vergis, chairman of the board at Amneal Pharmaceuticals; James Tyree, chairman of Tyree & D'Angelo Partners; and Steven Shulman, managing partner of Shulman Family Ventures.

Investments and activist campaigns
In 2011, Starboard won seats on the boards of SurModics, a maker of biopharmaceuticals, and Regis, a chain of hair-cutting salons.

In December 2011, Starboard sought to gain seats on AOL's board, charging that the firm's CEO, Tim Armstrong, was "wasting money by funding the losses at Patch, a network of local-news websites," and calling on Armstrong to "return to shareholders much of the more than $1 billion it received from the sale of its patents to Microsoft in 2012." Although Starboard lost a proxy battle six months later, Armstrong followed Starboard's advice, spinning off Patch and returning the $1 billion from Microsoft to its shareholders. Consequently, the value of Starboard's AOL stock more than doubled.

After accumulating a 15% stake in Office Depot, Starboard asked for its CEO, Neil Austrian, to be fired, and urged that the firm complete its merger with Office Max. Office Depot gave Starboard three board seats. Starboard also called for a merger between Office Depot and Staples, but the Federal Trade Commission ruled against it for anti-trust reasons, and a judge agreed with the FTC's verdict.

In November 2017, Starboard Value took a 10.7% stake in Mellanox Technologies, an Israeli semiconductor firm. Asserting that Mellanox was spending too much on research and development and other expenses, Starboard urged the company to improve its margins. In January 2018, Starboard Value tried to remove the entire Mellanox board.

In December 2017, Starboard Value bought a 9.9% stake in Cars.com, which it considered to be undervalued and potentially salable.

In August 2018, Starboard Value disclosed that it had accumulated a 5.8% stake in Symantec and had nominated five directors to Symantec's board. Symantec responded that it was evaluating the Starboard nominations and had not yet scheduled its 2018 Annual Meeting. In September 2018, Symantec announced that three nominees of Starboard were joining the Symantec board, two with immediate effect (including Starboard Managing Member Peter Feld) and one following the 2018 Annual Meeting of Stockholders.

In addition, Starboard has taken activist positions in Smithfield Foods, Calgon Carbon, Tessera Technologies, Yahoo, Brink's Home Security, Macy's, Darden Restaurants, and Papa John's Pizza.

Darden takeover
In October 2014, after what William D. Cohan of Fortune Magazine described as a "brilliantly executed campaign" involving "withering public criticism" of the firm's leadership and "careful courtship" of its major shareholders, Smith effectively took control of Darden Restaurants, a Fortune 500 company that owns Olive Garden and Longhorn Steakhouse. Among Smith's criticisms was that the pasta at Olive Garden was inadequately salted. On the HBO program Last Week Tonight, host John Oliver did a three-minute comedy bit based on Starboard's presentation. As of February 1, 2018, it had been seen by nearly four million viewers. While owning less than 10% of the firm, Smith replaced the entire board and became Darden's chairman. By doing so, wrote Cohan, Smith "fired a shot over the bows of directors everywhere," informing them that shareholders were now in the ascendant, and "managers ignore them at their peril." According to Cohan, "the scope of Smith's triumph with Darden has left jaws hanging open across Wall Street and beyond. Only in a handful of times in the past few years has an activist managed to replace an entire board of directors, and never at a company the size of Darden." After Starboard took over Darden, its stock went up by almost 60%.

Profitability 
From 2002 to 2014, Starboard generated annualized returns of 15.5%. Fully 84% of its activist campaigns have been profitable. Since 2004, Starboard has replaced over 80 directors on about 30 boards.

References

External links

Financial services companies established in 2002
Investment companies of the United States
Investment companies based in New York City
Hedge fund firms of the United States